YY1 (Yin Yang 1) is a transcriptional repressor protein in humans that is encoded by the YY1 gene.

Function 

YY1 is a ubiquitously distributed transcription factor belonging to the GLI-Kruppel class of zinc finger proteins. The protein is involved in repressing and activating a diverse number of promoters. Hence, the YY in the name stands for "yin-yang." YY1 may direct histone deacetylases and histone acetyltransferases to a promoter in order to activate or repress the promoter, thus implicating histone modification in the function of YY1. YY1 promotes enhancer-promoter chromatin loops by forming dimers and promoting DNA interactions. Its dysregulation disrupts enhancer-promoter loops and gene expression.

Clinical significance 
YY1 heterozygous deletions, missense, and nonsense mutations cause Gabriele-DeVries syndrome (GADEVS), an autosomal dominant neurodevelopmental disorder characterized by intellectual disability, dysmorphic facial features, feeding problems, intrauterine growth restriction, variable cognitive impairment, behavioral problems and other congenital malformations. A website is available in order to collect and share clinical information between clinicians and the families of affected individuals.

Interactions 

YY1 has been shown to interact with:

 ATF6, 
 EP300 
 FKBP3 
 HDAC3 
 Histone deacetylase 2 
 Myc 
 NOTCH1 
 RYBP and
 SAP30 
 Serine—tRNA ligase

References

Further reading

External links 
 
 

Transcription factors